Herbert C. Adams (born ) is an American historian, politician, and journalist from Maine. A Democrat, Adams was a member of the Portland School Committee from 1997–2004. He represented the Portland neighborhoods of East Bayside and Parkside in the Maine House of Representatives. He is also a noted historian of local history, having published Bold Vision: the History of the Portland Park System in 2000.

In 2010, term limits prevented him from seeking re-election, and the district he represented, 119, was won by independent Ben Chipman. In 2012, Chipman won re-election, turning back Adams' attempt to regain the seat, 1,884 to 1,272. A third contender in the race, Republican Gwendolyne Tuttle, received 317 votes.

He is an instructor in history at Southern Maine Community College.

He was educated at the University of Southern Maine and John F. Kennedy School of Government at Harvard University.

References

External links
Information from the 122nd Legislature (2005-2006) on Representative Adams

1950s births
Living people
Politicians from Portland, Maine
Democratic Party members of the Maine House of Representatives
People from Oxford County, Maine
Historians of Maine
Southern Maine Community College faculty
Portland, Maine School Board members
University of Southern Maine alumni
Harvard Kennedy School alumni
Historians from Maine